Jaouad Zairi (born 17 April 1982) is a Moroccan professional footballer who played as a winger. He represented the Morocco national team between 2000 and 2009, making 34 appearances and scoring six goals.

Early life
Zairi was born into a large family in Taza, Morocco.  At the age of 2, his family moved to Mâcon, a small French city.  In 1997, he moved to FC Gueugnon.

Club career
Zairi joined the French Ligue 2 team FC Gueugnon at the age of 15.  In the summer of 2001, he joined FC Sochaux and played for them until 2008. In January 2006 he was loaned to the Saudi club Al-Ittihad. He moved to Portugal and played for one year with Boavista F.C. (2006–2007). He returned in France and played another year with FC Nantes (2007–2008).

He moved to Greece and played for Super League Greece side Asteras Tripolis for the 2008–09 season.

On 25 April 2009, Olympiacos announced Zairi would join for the 2009–10 season. He won the 2010–11 Super League Greece with the club. After two seasons with Olympiacos he was informed by Olympiacos' manager Ernesto Valverde that he was not to renew his contract with the club and that he was free to leave.

In July 2017, he made an appearance for Indonesian club Persija Jakarta in a friendly match against Espanyol.

International career
Zairi made a debut for Morocco national team in 2000. He played in the Africa Cup of Nations in 2004 when Morocco made it to the finals but lost to their North African rivals Tunisia.

Zairi also played for Morocco at the 2000 Summer Olympics.

International goals
Scores and results list Morocco's goal tally first, score column indicates score after each Zairi goal.

Honours
Olympiacos
 Superleague Greece: 2010–11

Morocco
Africa Cup of Nations runner-up: 2004

References

External links

Living people
1983 births
People from Taza
Association football wingers
Association football midfielders
Moroccan footballers
Morocco international footballers
Moroccan expatriate footballers
2004 African Cup of Nations players
2006 Africa Cup of Nations players
Primeira Liga players
Super League Greece players
Cypriot First Division players
Ligue 1 players
Ligue 2 players
Saudi Professional League players
FC Gueugnon players
FC Sochaux-Montbéliard players
Boavista F.C. players
FC Nantes players
Asteras Tripolis F.C. players
Olympiacos F.C. players
PAS Giannina F.C. players
Anorthosis Famagusta F.C. players
Ittihad FC players
Al-Nasr SC (Salalah) players
GOAL FC players
Expatriate footballers in Portugal
Expatriate footballers in Greece
Expatriate footballers in France
Expatriate footballers in Cyprus
Expatriate footballers in Saudi Arabia
Expatriate footballers in Oman
Olympic footballers of Morocco
Footballers at the 2000 Summer Olympics
Moroccan expatriate sportspeople in Cyprus
Moroccan expatriate sportspeople in Oman
Moroccan expatriate sportspeople in Portugal
Moroccan expatriate sportspeople in Greece
Moroccan expatriate sportspeople in France